Palayakkara Naicker  is  a Telugu caste that commonly resides in the Indian states of Tamil Nadu (Palayakkars) Andhra Pradesh (Pala Ekari) and some parts of Karnataka (Palegara) in India   They are variously known as Palayakkara Naidu,  Palayakkaran, Muthiriya Naidu and Muthiriya Naicker. Their ancestors were soldiers in what is now the state of Andhra Pradesh, where they served the polygars. Thus, many still speak the Telugu language at home and the Tamil language outside.
The community are mostly distributed in the  Chengalpattu and North Arcot   districts of Tamil Nadu but were originally from what is now the state of Andhra Pradesh.

References

Social groups of Tamil Nadu